The 1980–81 Kent Football League season was the 15th in the history of the Kent Football League, a football competition in England.
 
The league was won by Cray Wanderers, but the club was not promoted to the Southern Football League.

League table

The league featured 17 clubs which competed in the previous season, no new clubs joined the league this season.

League table

References

External links

1980-81
1980–81 in English football leagues